The canton of Sarrebourg is an administrative division of the Moselle department, northeastern France. Its borders were modified at the French canton reorganisation which came into effect in March 2015. Its seat is in Sarrebourg.

It consists of the following communes:
 
Assenoncourt
Avricourt
Azoudange
Bébing
Belles-Forêts
Berthelming
Bettborn
Bickenholtz
Buhl-Lorraine
Desseling
Diane-Capelle
Dolving
Fénétrange
Fleisheim
Foulcrey
Fribourg
Gondrexange
Gosselming
Guermange
Haut-Clocher
Hellering-lès-Fénétrange
Hertzing
Hilbesheim
Hommarting
Ibigny
Imling
Kerprich-aux-Bois
Langatte
Languimberg
Mittersheim
Moussey
Niederstinzel
Oberstinzel
Postroff
Réchicourt-le-Château
Réding
Rhodes
Richeval
Romelfing
Saint-Georges
Saint-Jean-de-Bassel
Sarraltroff
Sarrebourg
Schalbach 
Veckersviller
Vieux-Lixheim

References

Cantons of Moselle (department)